This is a list of artists on Universal Music Group Nashville. Universal Music Group Nashville comprises the Nashville branches of MCA Records, Mercury Records and Capitol Records, as well as Lost Highway Records. Formerly, the company included the Nashville branch of DreamWorks Records.

MCA Nashville Records
As MCA Records reissued recordings previously released on other labels, only country music artists whose recordings were first issued on the MCA or MCA Nashville label are to be listed here.

Jordan Davis
Vince Gill
Sam Hunt
Parker McCollum
Reba McEntire
Kip Moore
Kacey Musgraves 
George Strait
Josh Turner

Former artists

Gary Allan (from Decca)
Bill Anderson
Atlanta
The Bellamy Brothers (MCA/Curb)
Marty Brown
Ed Bruce
Buck Howdy
Jimmy Buffett (from ABC)
Tracy Byrd
Lionel Cartwright
Mark Chesnutt 
Roy Clark (from ABC)
John Conlee
Ronnie Dove
Bobbie Cryner
Desert Rose Band (MCA/Curb)
Clare Dunn
Ronnie Dunn (Churchill/MCA)
Steve Earle
Alecia Elliott
Evangeline (Margaritaville)
Terri Gibbs
Nancy Griffith
Merle Haggard
Hanna-McEuen (singles only, album was issued on DreamWorks)
Keith Harling
Mallary Hope
Hot Apple Pie (singles only, album was issued on DreamWorks)
James House
Randy Houser
Rebecca Lynn Howard 
Jedd Hughes
Waylon Jennings
Olivia Newton-John
George Jones
Wynonna Judd (MCA/Curb)
Josh Kelley
Shannon Lawson
Brenda Lee (from Decca)
Joni Lee
Patty Loveless
Lyle Lovett (MCA/Curb)
Shelby Lynne
Barbara Mandrell (from ABC)
Kathy Mattea
The Mavericks
McAlyster
McBride & the Ride
Ronnie McDowell
Bill Monroe (from Decca)
Allison Moorer 
Lorrie Morgan (from ABC)
David Lee Murphy
David Nail
The Oak Ridge Boys (from ABC)
J. P. Pennington
Randy Rogers Band
Raybon Brothers
Dennis Robbins
John Wesley Ryles
Run C&W
John Schneider
Earl Scruggs
Ashton Shepherd
Sons of the Desert
Roger Springer
Karen Staley
Ray Stevens
Marty Stuart
Marsha Thornton
Tanya Tucker
Conway Twitty
Gene Watson
Drake White
The Whites
Little David Wilkins
Don Williams
Kelly Willis
Lee Ann Womack (from Decca; left MCA in 2006 and rejoined in 2008)
Chely Wright
Curtis Wright (MCA/Airborne)
Tammy Wynette
Trisha Yearwood
James & Michael Younger

Formerly on Decca Nashville

Bill Anderson
Rhett Akins
Gary Allan 
Patsy Cline
Mark Chesnutt
Helen Darling 
Frazier River
Rebecca Lynn Howard 
Chris Knight 
Brenda Lee 
Loretta Lynn
Dolly Parton 
Dawn Sears
Shane Stockton
Mel Tillis
Conway Twitty 
Lee Ann Womack

Formerly on Rising Tide Nashville

Matraca Berg 
The Buffalo Club
Scotty Emerick
Jack Ingram
J. C. Jones
Delbert McClinton
Nitty Gritty Dirt Band
Rebecca Lynn Howard
Kris Tyler 
Tony Toliver

Formerly on DreamWorks Nashville

Jessica Andrews 
Lisa Angelle 
Linda Davis
Roxie Dean
Scotty Emerick 
Emerson Drive 
Jeff Foxworthy
Hanna-McEuen
Hot Apple Pie
Joanna Janét 
Jolie & The Wanted 
Toby Keith
Tracy Lawrence
Mac McAnally 
The Nitty Gritty Dirt Band
Danielle Peck 
Michelle Poe
Redmon & Vale 
Johnny Reid 
Shane Sellers
Chalee Tennison 
Randy Travis
Mike Walker 
Jimmy Wayne 
Darryl Worley

Mercury Nashville Records
Artists whose only UMG-distributed recordings were first issued by MGM Records or Polydor Records are not listed here.

Current artists
Priscilla Block
Billy Currington
Travis Denning
Maddie & Tae
Chris Stapleton
The War and Treaty

Former artists

Lauren Alaina (Interscope/Mercury Nashville)
Daniele Alexander
Harley Allen
John Anderson
Lynn Anderson
Steve Azar
Butch Baker
The Bama Band
The Band Perry (Interscope/Mercury Nashville)
Bon Jovi (promotion only)
Larry Boone
Laura Bell Bundy
John Brannen
The Burch Sisters
Rodney Carrington
Johnny Cash
Chance
Terri Clark
Coldwater Jane
Easton Corbin
Corbin/Hanner
Neal Coty
Billy Ray Cyrus
Davis Daniel
Wesley Dennis
Daisy Dern
Roy Drusky
Meredith Edwards
Leon Everette
Halfway to Hazard (StyleSonic/Mercury Nashville)
Eric Heatherly
Julianne Hough
Jamey Johnson
David Lynn Jones
Toby Keith
The Kentucky Headhunters
Sammy Kershaw
Jeff Knight
Tracy Lawrence
Little Big Town
Cledus Maggard & the Citizen's Band
Marcel
Jim Matt
Kathy Mattea
Scotty McCreery (Interscope/Mercury Nashville)
Brian McComas
Reba McEntire
Shane Minor
Randy Montana
Kacey Musgraves
David Nail
Jennifer Nettles
Gary Nichols 
James Otto
Randy Rogers Band
Julie Roberts
Ronna Reeves
Kim Richey
Jenny Simpson
Anthony Smith
Canaan Smith
The Statler Brothers
Keith Stegall
Sugarland 
Shania Twain
Twister Alley
Dan Tyminski
John & Audrey Wiggins
Mark Wills
Holly Williams
Lee Ann Womack
The Wrays
Wright Brothers Band
Wynonna (Mercury/Curb)

Formerly on Polydor Nashville

4 Runner
Amie Comeaux 
Davis Daniel
Clinton Gregory
Toby Keith
The Moffatts
Chely Wright

Capitol Records Nashville
Dierks Bentley
Luke Bryan
Mickey Guyton
Caylee Hammack
Hootie & The Blowfish
Little Big Town
Jon Pardi
Darius Rucker
Carrie Underwood
Keith Urban

Former artists

Trace Adkins
Susan Ashton
The Bama Band
Joe Barnhill
Stephanie Bentley
John Berry
Suzy Bogguss
Lisa Brokop
Garth Brooks
Kix Brooks
T. Graham Brown
Rodney Carrington
Chris Cagle
Glen Campbell
Paulette Carlson
Deana Carter
Jameson Clark
Jessi Colter
Billy "Crash" Craddock
Kenny Dale
Linda Davis
Clay Davidson
Billy Dean
The Delevantes
Amber Dotson
George Ducas
Whitney Duncan
Ty England
Skip Ewing
Cleve Francis
Crystal Gayle (United Artists/Liberty)
Ricky Lynn Gregg
Merle Haggard
Adam Hambrick (Buena Vista/Capitol Nashville)
Jennifer Hanson
Joni Harms
Walker Hayes
Steven Wayne Horton
The Jenkins
David Lynn Jones
Charles Kelley
Lady A (formerly Lady Antebellum)
Chris LeDoux
Joni Lee
Tom Mabe 
Barbara Mandrell
Mason Dixon
Delbert McClinton
Mindy McCready
Jennette McCurdy
Mel McDaniel
Scott McQuaig
Dean Miller
Dude Mowrey
Anne Murray
Emilio Navaira
Willie Nelson
Juice Newton
Nitty Gritty Dirt Band
Jamie O'Neal
Allison Paige
Palomino Road
Pearl River
Pirates of the Mississippi
Eddie Rabbitt
The Ranch
Eddy Raven
 Ashley Ray
Julie Reeves 
River Road
Kenny Rogers
Roy Rogers
Linda Ronstadt
Sawyer Brown (Curb/Capitol)
Don Schlitz
Thom Schuyler
Shenandoah
Ryan Shupe & The RubberBand
Russell Smith
Jo-El Sonnier
Verlon Thompson
Cyndi Thomson
Trader-Price
Tanya Tucker
Conway Twitty
Steve Wariner
Emily West
Dottie West
Cheryl Wheeler
Lari White
Wild Rose
Jeff Wood
Tim Wilson
Curtis Wright
Billy Yates
Faron Young

Formerly on Patriot Nashville

Bryan Austin  
John Berry
Lisa Brokop
Noah Gordon

Formerly on Virgin Nashville

Chris Cagle
Clay Davidson
Jerry Kilgore
Tom Mabe
Roy D. Mercer
Julie Reeves
River Road

EMI Records Nashville
Brothers Osborne
Eric Church
Tyler Hubbard
Alan Jackson
Jon Langston (32 Bridge Entertainment/EMI Records Nashville)
Kylie Morgan

Former artists

Gary Allan
Kelleigh Bannen
Chrissy Metz
Jennifer Nettles
Troy Olsen
Eric Paslay
Hillary Scott & the Scott Family

Buena Vista Records
CB30

Unassigned Artists on Universal Music Group Nashville
Josh Ross (Universal Music Canada/UMG Nashville)

References

Universal Music Group Nashville